The 1989 NCAA Skiing Championships were contested at the Jackson Hole Mountain Resort in Jackson Hole, Wyoming as the 36th annual NCAA-sanctioned ski tournament to determine the individual and team national champions of men's and women's collegiate slalom and cross-country skiing in the United States.

Vermont, coached by Chip LaCasse, claimed their second team national championship, just four points ahead of three-time defending champions Utah in the cumulative team standings.

Venue

This year's championships were contested at the Jackson Hole Mountain Resort in Jackson Hole, Wyoming.

These were the second NCAA championships held at Jackson Hole as well as the second in the state of Wyoming (1974 and 1989).

Program

Men's events
 Cross country, 10 kilometer classical
 Cross country, 20 kilometer freestyle
 Slalom
 Giant slalom

Women's events
 Cross country, 10 kilometer classical
 Cross country, 20 kilometer freestyle
 Slalom
 Giant slalom

Team scoring

 DC – Defending champions

See also
List of NCAA skiing programs

References

1989 in sports in Wyoming
NCAA Skiing Championships
NCAA Skiing Championships
1989 in alpine skiing
1989 in cross-country skiing